Forks High School (FHS) is a comprehensive Washington public high school on South Spartan Avenue in the city of Forks, Washington, serving grades 9-12 in the Quillayute Valley School District. It is the only high school in the district, and is the successor to Forks Middle School. The school is governed under the authority of the Office of Superintendent of Public Instruction (OSPI) of Washington.

It has received international attention, as it was featured in the young adult novel series Twilight by Stephenie Meyer.

The current campus was built in two phases with a total cost of $25.3 million: one in 2000 and one in 2012.

References

External links
Forks H.S.
Quillayute Valley School District

High schools in Clallam County, Washington
Public high schools in Washington (state)